Paul Brand may refer to:

Paul Brand (historian) (born 1946), British legal historian
Paul Brand (journalist), British journalist
Paul Brand (physician) (1914–2003), English physician